Erowal Bay is a small town in the Shoalhaven local government area on the New South Wales south coast, on the northern side of St Georges Basin. It lies west of Hyams Beach, north of Wrights Beach and east of Old Erowal Bay.

References

Towns in New South Wales
City of Shoalhaven